47th is a station on the Chicago Transit Authority's 'L' system, serving the Red Line. The station is located in the median of the Dan Ryan Expressway in the Fuller Park neighborhood. Access to the station is available from a staircase at the middle of the north side of the 47th Street overpass, where an open canopy crosswalk with traffic signals leads to a bus stop on the south side of the overpass.

47th was closed from May 19 to October 20, 2013, as part of the Red Line Reconstruction Project.

History

2005-2006 renovations 
On December 12, 2006, an elevator was put in service at the 47th station, making 47th ADA-compliant. Sixteen days later, on the 28th, escalators began service in the station as well. The glass canopy above the crosswalk outside of 47th station was improved to include images of the Stock Yards 'L' line that operated over a decade before the Red Line.

Bus connections
CTA
  15 Jeffery Local 
  24 Wentworth  (Weekdays only) 
 43 43rd 
  47 47th 
  51 51st

Notes and references

Notes

References

External links 

 Train schedule (PDF) at CTA official site
 47th/Dan Ryan Station Page at Chicago-L.org
 47th/Dan Ryan Station Page CTA official site
 47th Street entrance from Google Maps Street View

CTA Red Line stations
Railway stations in the United States opened in 1969
Railway stations in Chicago